Radio:Active (stylised as Radio:ACTIVE) is the fourth studio album by English pop rock band McFly. It is the band's first album under their new, self-created label, Super Records. The album was first released via a promotion with the Mail on Sunday on 20 July 2008. The album was officially released on 22 September 2008, with the official release being branded the 'Deluxe Edition'.

Since its release, Radio:Active has sold over 500,000 copies worldwide. It has also received a Gold sales status certification for sales of over 100,000 copies in the UK.

Background
McFly made the decision to first issue the album free with the Mail on Sunday. More than 2.4 million copies of the album were given away free, which represented a 300,000 copy increase from the paper's average circulation. Tom Fletcher revealed the strategy: "We get to put it into almost three million homes, which is an incredible opportunity for us. Hopefully the three million people will all enjoy the music and they'll decide to see us when we go on tour." Mail on Sunday managing director Stephen Miron said both "the band and the paper were very happy with the sale". The album was officially released in shops on 22 September 2008. Compared to The Mail on Sunday version, this version contained four extra tracks (including new single "Lies"), but removes the single "The Heart Never Lies". This edition also includes a bonus DVD and a 32-page booklet.

On 29 September 2008, British chain Woolworths issued an exclusive version with three bonus acoustic tracks. On 8 December 2008, a single disc version of the album was released, removing the bonus DVD and the song lyrics in the booklet. At this point, the 'deluxe version' was discontinued. In Japan, the album was available with three different covers, as way of an incentive to collect all three editions. Each edition also contained a different bonus track or DVD feature.

Song information

Fletcher explained each track in a track-by-track interview.

Singles
 "One for the Radio" was released as the album's official lead single. "One for the Radio" received a platinum sales status certification for sales of over 100,000 in Brazil.
 "Lies" was released as the album's second single, despite only appearing the deluxe edition of Radio:Active.
 The double A-side "Do Ya / Stay With Me" was released as the album's third single on 23 November 2008. The single was also the official Children in Need single for 2008.
 "Falling in Love" was released as a promotional single in promotion of the group's Radio:Active DVD.

Track listing

Personnel
Danny Jones – Lead guitar, lead vocals, executive producer
Tom Fletcher – Rhythm guitar, lead vocals, piano, keyboard
Harry Judd – drums, percussion
Dougie Poynter – bass, backing vocals
Jamie Norton  – keyboard
Jason Perry – guitar, backing vocals, producer, executive producer
Tom Lord-Alge – mixer

Tour
 See also: Radio:Active Live at Wembley
The fifteen date Radio:ACTIVE tour took place throughout November 2008. A live concert DVD was filmed at Wembley Arena on 27 November 2008 and released on 11 May 2009.

 Tour Dates
 7 November – Sheffield Arena
 8 November – Newcastle Metro Radio Arena
 10 November – Belfast Odyssey
 11 November – Dublin RDS
 14 November – Birmingham NEC
 15 November – Bournemouth International Centre
 16 November – Plymouth Pavilions 
 18 November – Brighton Centre
 19 November – Cardiff International Centre 
 21 November – Nottingham Arena 
 22 November – Manchester Arena
 24 November – Aberdeen AECC
 25 November – Glasgow SECC
 27 November – London Wembley Arena
 29 November – Liverpool Echo Arena

 Setlist
 "One for the Radio"
 "Everybody Knows"
 "Going Through The Motions"
 "Obviously"
 "Transylvania"
 "Corrupted"
 "POV"
 "Falling in Love"
 "Star Girl"
 "That Girl"
 "Do Ya"
 "Black Or White"
 "Room on the 3rd Floor"
 "All About You"
 "The Last Song"
 "Lies"
 "Five Colours in Her Hair"

Charts and certifications

Charts

Certifications

Release history

References

McFly albums
2008 albums
Albums produced by Jason Perry